Amelia and the Angel is a 1958 British film directed by Ken Russell. It was his second completed film after Peep Show. The movie was seen by Huw Wheldon and led to his offering Russell a full-time job.

Plot
A schoolgirl, Amelia, attempts to find an angel costume in time to appear in her school play.

Cast
Mercedes Quadros as Amelia

Production
Russell was then a photographer who wanted to get into the film industry and thought of the idea. He says he was influenced by La Belle et Bete and The Red Balloon. Quadros was the daughter of an uruguayan diplomat and was recommended to Russell by a friend. Russell's wife Shirley did the costumes.

Filming took two weeks and was financed by Russell himself – the budget was "peanuts... about 100 pounds" he said. Russell said Quadros "was delightful, no trouble at all – as long as I gave her scary whirlwind rides in an old, broken-down Morris 8 I had she was as good as gold. I remember she fell over on the steps of the Albert Memorial at one point and broke her hand, the poor devil. In most of the film, she has her right hand turned away from the camera."

Reception
The film screened in cinemas in 1958 for the Experimental Film Committee.

Russell showed the film to Huw Wheldon at the BBC and led to Wheldon offering Russell a job on Monitor. The director later said "A lot of people who were trying to get work on Monitor at the time made films about things like the barrow-boys of Elephant and Castle. Mine was such a change from anything like that and Huw was impressed by it because it was so unusual; he wasn't expecting a film of that sort of quality.""

The film has remained popular over the years. "It's just a nice story, that's all," said Russell.

References

External links

Amelia and the Angel at Letterboxd
Amelia and the Angel at BFI Screenonline

1958 films
British short films
1958 short films
Films directed by Ken Russell
1950s English-language films